Adolf Kozieradski (30 June 1835 - 14 November 1901) was a Polish operatic bass-baritone. He notably created the role of Miecznik in the world premiere of Stanisław Moniuszko's The Haunted Manor at the Great Theatre, Warsaw in 1865.

References

1835 births
1901 deaths
Operatic bass-baritones
19th-century Polish male opera singers